Corylopsis spicata (winter hazel) is a plant in the witch hazel family, Hamamelidaceae. It is a shrub with alternate, simple leaves, on thin, flexible, horizontal stems. The flowers are yellow, borne in late winter and early spring.

References

Hamamelidaceae
Plants described in 1836